Hitler's Priestess: Savitri Devi, the Hindu-Aryan Myth and Neo-Nazism is a book by Nicholas Goodrick-Clarke.  It is a biography of Savitri Devi.

It was published by New York University Press in hardcover in June 1998 and in paperback in October 2000.

Contents
 Introduction: Discovered Alive in India: Hitler's Guru!
  Hellas and Judah
  Āryāvarta
  Hindu nationalism
  The Nazi Brahmin
  The Duce of Bengal
  Akhenaten and Animal Rights
  The Hitler Avatar
  Defiance
  Pilgrimage
  The ODESSA Connection
  Inside the Neo-Nazi International
  Last Years and Legacy: Nazis, Greens, and the New Age
 Notes and References, Bibliographical Note, Index, About the Author

References

External links
 Brief review
 

1998 non-fiction books
Hindu nationalism
New York University Press books
Books about the far right